Vuoti is a surname. Notable people with the surname include:

Santeri Vuoti (born 1995), Finnish ice hockey player
Sauli Vuoti (born 1979), Finnish musician and chemist

Finnish-language surnames